Zoltán Aczél (born 13 May 1967) is Hungarian retired footballer who played as a defender. His previous clubs include Hungarian football clubs such as Újpest FC, BFC Siófok, Vác-Újbuda LTC, Pécsi Mecsek FC, BVSC Budapest and FC Dabas, and Austrian ones such as SV Ried and TSV Hartberg, and the South Korean club Daewoo Royals. Aczél is manager of Szombathelyi Haladás.

External links
 
 
 

1967 births
Living people
Footballers from Budapest
Hungarian footballers
Association football defenders
Hungary international footballers
Újpest FC players
BFC Siófok players
K League 1 players
Busan IPark players
Vác FC players
FC Lausanne-Sport players
Pécsi MFC players
SV Ried players
TSV Hartberg players
Budapesti VSC footballers
Demecser FC footballers
FC Dabas footballers
Hungarian expatriate footballers
Expatriate footballers in South Korea
Expatriate footballers in Switzerland
Expatriate footballers in Austria
Hungarian expatriate sportspeople in South Korea
Hungarian expatriate sportspeople in Switzerland
Hungarian expatriate sportspeople in Austria
Hungarian football managers
Rákospalotai EAC managers
Hungary national football team managers
BFC Siófok managers
Diósgyőri VTK managers
Szigetszentmiklósi TK managers
Szombathelyi Haladás football managers
Nemzeti Bajnokság I managers